Bareilly Cantt. Assembly constituency is one of the 403 constituencies of the Uttar Pradesh Legislative Assembly, India. It is a part of the Bareilly district and one of the five assembly constituencies in the Bareilly Lok Sabha constituency. First election in this assembly constituency was held in 1957 after the "DPACO (1956)" (delimitation order) was passed in 1956. After the "Delimitation of Parliamentary and Assembly Constituencies Order" was passed in 2008, the constituency was assigned identification number 125.

Wards/Areas
Extent of Bareilly Cantt. Assembly constituency is Bareilly (CB), Ward Nos. 1, 2, 5, 6, 8 to 11, 16, 17, 20, 21, 25, 27, 33, 34, 35, 38, 40, 42 to 45, 50, 52, 53, 54 & 57 to 60 in Bareilly (M Corp.) of 4 Bareilly Tehsil.

Members of the Legislative Assembly

Election results

2022

2017

See also
 Bareilly district
 Bareilly Lok Sabha constituency
 Sixteenth Legislative Assembly of Uttar Pradesh
 Uttar Pradesh Legislative Assembly
 Vidhan Bhawan

References

External links
 

Assembly constituencies of Uttar Pradesh
Bareilly
Constituencies established in 1956
Politics of Bareilly district